Roman Novotný (born 5 January 1986) is a Czech long jumper.

He finished seventh at the 2003 World Youth Championships, won the silver medal at the 2007 Summer Universiade and finished eighth at the 2008 Olympic Games.

His personal best jump is 8.21 metres, achieved in July 2008 in Brno.

Competition record

References
 

1986 births
Living people
Czech male long jumpers
Athletes (track and field) at the 2008 Summer Olympics
Athletes (track and field) at the 2012 Summer Olympics
Olympic athletes of the Czech Republic
Universiade medalists in athletics (track and field)
Universiade bronze medalists for the Czech Republic